Beijing Women Football Club is a Chinese professional football club located in Beijing. They compete in the Chinese Women's Super League, and their home stadium is Xiannongtan Stadium.

History

Beijing Women's Football Team was established in 1984 or 1985 under the regional sports commission. In 1996 Weikerui Company bought the club which was re-branded as Weikerui Company Women's Football Team. When Weikerui  went bankrupt in 1998 the sports commission continued the team, who in 1999 were named Beijing Construction Company Women's Football Team following a three-year, RMB7.8m sponsorship deal.

Beijing Enterprises ownership

In November 2016, Beijing Enterprises took control of the team and promised an ambitious program of funding and development, aiming to become national champions within three to five years. The club signed a cooperation agreement with the French Football Federation in July 2017, which they hoped would help them replicate the success of the French youth academy at Clairefontaine.

After another disappointing season in 2017, coach Liu Ying was replaced with Kim Björkegren from Swedish champions Linköpings FC. Björkegren named recently retired Elena Sadiku as his fitness coach. Zhao Rong returned to the club after a two-year loan in Changchun. In February 2018 the club announced the signing of Verónica Boquete.

Under Bjorkegren, the club finished sixth in the 2018 Chinese Women's Super League but enjoyed better results in cup competitions as they reached the last four of both the CFA Tournament and CFA Cup.

In January 2019, Bjorkegren left the club to be replaced by his former assistant Yu Yun as the new head coach. On 23 February 2019, their foreign players for the 2019 season were announced as South African duo Thembi Kgatlana and Linda Motlhalo.

Players

First team squad
As of 15 October 2022

Former internationals

 Chen Yanhong
 Gu Yasha
 Liu Ailing
 Liu Shanshan
 Ma Xiaoxu
 Wang Chen
 Wang Lingling
 Wang Yan
 Xu Huan
 Zhang Linyan
 Zhao Rong
 Thembi Kgatlana
 Linda Motlhalo
 Vero Boquete
 Marija Banusic

References

External links
 Official Website

 
Chinese Women's Super League clubs
1984 establishments in China
Association football clubs established in 1984
Women's football clubs in China